Plym can refer to:
  River Plym, in Devon
 HMS Plym (K271), a River class frigate
 Plym and Plym II, former and current Torpoint Ferries
 Plym, a GWR Caliph Class locomotive